Akauna may refer to any of the following places in Bihar, India:

 Akauna, Patna, Bihar, a village in Masaurhi block
 Akauna, Nalanda, Bihar, a village in Ben block
 Akauna, Aurangabad, Bihar, a village in Goh block
 Akauna, Nawada, Bihar, a village in Sirdala block
 Akauna Minhai, Nawada, Bihar, a village in Nawada